Paolo Riccio  (1480 - 1541)  was a German Jewish convert to Christianity in the first half of the sixteenth century. He became professor of philosophy in the University of Pavia; subsequently he was physician to Emperor Maximilian I.

Riccio was inclined to astrology and the Cabala, and had a controversy with Johann Eck about the existence of life on the stellar bodies. Erasmus thought very highly of Riccio, who defended him and his followers against the attacks of Stephen the Presbyter. Like most converts from Judaism, Riccio attempted to convince the Jews of the truth of the Gospels. He, moreover, advised the Christian nations to unite against the Turks, who were at that time the terror of Europe.

Riccio was a prolific writer and, as Heinrich Graetz says, "turned to good account the small amount of Jewish knowledge which he brought with him to Christianity". His best-known work is his De Porta Lucis R. Josephi Gecatilia (Augsburg, 1516), which is a free translation of a part of the Kabbalistic work Sha'are Orah by Joseph Gikatilla. Jerome Riccio (Hieronymus Ricius), Paulo's son, sent a copy of this work to Johann Reuchlin, who utilized it in the composition of his De Arte Cabbalistica.

Riccio relates that he was ordered by Emperor Maximilian to prepare a Latin translation of the Talmud. All that has come down of it are the translations of the tractates Berakot, Sanhedrin, and Makkot (Augsburg, 1519), which are the earliest Latin renderings of the Mishnah known to bibliographers.

The most important of his other works is De Cælesti Agricultura, a large religio-philosophical work in four parts, dedicated to Emperor Charles V and to his brother Ferdinand (Augsburg, 1541; 2d ed., Basel, 1597). His Opuscula Varia, which contains a treatise on the 613 commandments, a religio-philosophical and controversial work aiming to demonstrate to the Jews the truths of Christianity, and an introduction to the Cabala followed by a compilation of its rules and dogmas, went through four editions (Pavia, 1510; Augsburg, 1515; ib. 1541; and Basel, 1597).

Riccio wrote besides these works about ten others, all in Latin, on various religious, philosophical, and cabalistic subjects, which appeared in Augsburg in 1546 and were reprinted in Basel in 1597.

References 
 Adams: History of the Jews, p. 286, London, 1840;
 Bischoff: Kritische Geschichte der Thalmud-Uebersetzungen, pp. 34, 43, 44, Frankfort-on-the-Main, 1899;
 Fürst, Bibl. Jud. ii. 41, iii. 155;
 Ginsburg, Massoret ha-Massoret, p. 9, London, 1867;
 Grätz, Gesch. ix. 172 et seq.;
 Michelsen: Israel und die Kirche, pp. 87 et seq., Hamburg, 1869

Notes

External links 
 
  Old page from Vitae Germanorum medicorum, Transcription
 Online images of original works :
 Apologetica ad Exckiana responsa narratio
 De anima coeli compendium
 Ad principes, magistratus, populosque Germaniae, in Spirensi conventu oratio
 De novem doctrinarum ordinibus et totius perypatetici dogmatis nexu compendium, conclusiones atque oratio
 De sexcentem et tredecim Mosaice sanctionis edictis
  In apostolorum symbolum dialogus
 In cabalistarum seu allegorizantium eruditionem isagogae
 Pauli Ricii Philosophica, prophetica ac talmudistica, pro christiana veritate tuenda
 Portae lucis: haec est porta Tetragrammaton, iusti intrabunt per eam
 Statera prudentum

Converts to Roman Catholicism from Judaism
Academic staff of the University of Pavia
15th-century German Jews
German Roman Catholics
16th-century German writers
16th-century German male writers
Year of birth unknown
Year of death unknown
1480 births